Polys Haji-Ioannou (born 1959/1960) is a Cypriot billionaire, due mainly to his shareholding in EasyJet, the airline founded by his brother Stelios Haji-Ioannou.

Polys Haji-Ioannou is the son of Loucas Haji-Ioannou.

Haji-Ioannou owns Polyar Tankers, a shipping company, with about 20 tanker ships. He is based in Monaco, and owns more than 50 properties worldwide, including Singapore, Greece and India.

In 2001, he married Rosemarie Zoudrou; they have two children, and live in Monaco.

References

1960s births
Living people
Cypriot billionaires
Greek Cypriot people
Cypriot expatriates in Monaco
Polys